Michael Anthony Vasco is a Filipino professor and educational administrator.

Education and career 

Vasco is an alumnus of the University of Santo Tomas Faculty of Arts and Letters where he finished his bachelor in philosophy and where he served as dean in 2009. He was college secretary of the University of Santo Tomas College of Nursing. He is also an alumnus of the University of Santo Tomas Graduate School where he served as School Secretary, and as dean, upon his appointment in 2019. His scholarly work focuses on  Thomistic philosophy, contemporary European philosophy, social and political philosophy, Indian philosophy, Buddhist philosophy and comparative philosophy.

Renato Corona and Graduate School controversy 

Antonio Calipjo Go requested University of Santo Tomas for evaluation of his academic and professional work for college degree equivalence. The program is called Expanded Tertiary Education Equivalency and Accreditation Program (ETEEAP). This came after reports that the University of Santo Tomas Graduate School had reportedly bent its rules to grant former Chief Justice Renato Corona a doctorate in law, summa cum laude. Vasco said Go's letters were “bereft of detail” and didn't even enclose “a simple curriculum vitae highlighting the professional and academic related achievements” impacting on the journalism degree sought.

See also
University of Santo Tomas

References 

Academic staff of the University of Santo Tomas
University of Santo Tomas alumni
1977 births
Living people